Pierre Fitzgibbon is a Canadian politician, who was elected to the National Assembly of Quebec in the 2018 provincial election. He represents the electoral district of Terrebonne as a member of the Coalition Avenir Québec. He was Minister of Economic Development, Innovation and Export Trade from October 18, 2018 until resigning on June 2, 2021 in the wake of a report by the National Assembly ethics commissioner.

Electoral Record

Cabinet posts

References

Living people
Coalition Avenir Québec MNAs
21st-century Canadian politicians
People from Terrebonne, Quebec
Members of the Executive Council of Quebec
Year of birth missing (living people)